Babai Rural Municipality (Nepali :बबई गाउँपालिका) is a Gaunpalika in Dang District in Lumbini Province of Nepal. On 12 March 2017, the government of Nepal implemented a new local administrative structure, with the implementation of the new local administrative structure, VDCs have been replaced with municipal and Village Councils. Babai is one of these 753 local units. Babai Rural Municipality has area of 257.48 km2. Babai RM is surrounded by Shantinagar Rural Municipality and Dangisharan Rural Municipality in the east, Banke district in the west, Salyan district in the north and in south there is Dangisharan Rural Municipality and Banke district.

References 

Lumbini Province
Dang District, Nepal
Rural municipalities of Nepal established in 2017